Veski is a rural locality (a village) in Andreyevskoye Rural Settlement, Alexandrovsky District, Vladimir Oblast, Russia. The population was 81 as of 2010. There are 4 streets.

Geography 
Veski is located 5 km east of Alexandrov (the district's administrative centre) by road. Svetly is the nearest rural locality.

References 

Rural localities in Alexandrovsky District, Vladimir Oblast